George Clifford "Cliff" Wright (born 18 October 1944) is an English former footballer who played as a midfielder in the Football League for Hartlepools United and Darlington. He began his career as an apprentice with Middlesbrough, but never played for them in the league, and after leaving Darlington spent four-and-a-half seasons with Northern Premier League club Boston United.

He was a member of the Hartlepool team promoted to the Third Division for the first time in 1967–68.

References

1944 births
Living people
People from Lingdale
English footballers
Association football midfielders
Middlesbrough F.C. players
Hartlepool United F.C. players
Darlington F.C. players
Boston United F.C. players
English Football League players
Northern Premier League players
Footballers from Yorkshire